The Fyles Ministry is the current ministry of the 12th Chief Minister of the Northern Territory, Natasha Fyles. It came into operation on 13 May 2022 and succeeded the Gunner ministry.

Current ministry 
A full ministerial reshuffle was undertaken on 23 May 2022. Changes included the appointment of Eva Lawler as Treasurer and the addition of Ngaree Ah Kit to the cabinet.

First ministry 
The first ministry was sworn in on 13 May 2022, with ministers from the previous Gunner ministry retaining their roles for a week during the parliamentary sittings, before a reshuffle takes place. Fyles took on all of Gunner's previous roles in this interim arrangement.

References

External links
 The Cabinet

Northern Territory ministries
Lists of current office-holders in Australia